Naemeh (also Romanized as Nā’emeh; also known as Nā’emī and Nā’eh) is a village in Arabkhaneh Rural District, Shusef District, Nehbandan County, South Khorasan Province, Iran. At the 2006 census its population was 51, in 17 families.

References 

Populated places in Nehbandan County